The 1909–10 season was the fifth in the history of the Isthmian League, an English football competition.

Bromley were champions for a second time in a row.

League table

References

Isthmian League seasons
I